Delta Kappa Epsilon, commonly known as DKE or Deke, is one of the oldest fraternities in the United States, with fifty-six active chapters and five active colonies across North America. It was founded at Yale College in 1844 by fifteen sophomores who were discontent with the existing fraternity order on campus. The men established a fellowship where the candidate most favored was he who combined in the most equal proportions the Gentleman, the Scholar and the Jolly Good Fellow.

History

Founding fathers 
The fifteen founders were:  William Woodruff Atwater, Dr. Edward Griffin Bartlett, Frederic Peter Bellinger, Jr., Henry Case, Colonel George Foote Chester, John Butler Conyngham, Thomas Isaac Franklin, William Walter Horton, The Honorable William Boyd Jacobs, Professor Edward VanSchoonhoven Kinsley, Chester Newell Righter, Dr. Elisha Bacon Shapleigh, Thomas DuBois Sherwood, Albert Everett Stetson, and Orson William Stow. At this meeting, the Fraternity's secret and open Greek mottos were devised, as were the lapel pin design and secret grip. The open motto becoming – "Kerothen Philoi Aei"  – "Friends From The Heart, Forever."

Active and pledge pins, banded flag 
The  Flag consists of three bands of color: Azure (blue, truth), Champagne (gold, fidelity) and Gules (crimson, courage) with a dexter rampant lion in the middle band.  flags have been carried to the North Pole by its discoverer, Admiral Robert Peary and to the Moon by astronaut Alan Bean. Adorning the active pin are the Greek letters  etched downward, diagonally across an ivory scroll and centered atop an onyx diamond, encased in rope-textured gold trim and stars gracing each of the four corners. Active members' initials for their given name along with their number as initiated in chapter completes the active pin. Delta Kappa Epsilon pledges wear a triangle-shaped label pin with the same heraldic colors of Azure, Champagne & Crimson, with gold facing upward & always on collared shirts.

Chapters

Founding of chapters 

Within five years of the founding of Phi chapter at Yale, chapters were installed at Bowdoin College, Princeton University, Colby College, Amherst College, University of Nashville and University of Alabama.

October 16, 1844 - Phi adopted its chapter name; Sherwood begins chapter install at Bowdoin College.

November 1, 1844 - Theta chapter, first members initiated; initiation fee was a dollar & fifty cents.

September 15, 1845 - Zeta chapter, Princeton, only sixty-nine members initiated during brief initial existence (re-established in the 1980s).

November 1, 1846 - Sigma chapter, Amherst, founded by Ledoux.

December 23, 1946 - First  Convention, New Haven, Connecticut

Delta Kappa Epsilon's first West Coast chapter was founded at the University of California, Berkeley on Halloween night, 1876. The Mu chapter in Hamilton, New York at Colgate University is one of the few with a Temple, open only to DKE member initiates of the Mu chapter. The Lambda chapter at Kenyon College built the first fraternity lodge in 1854. Delta Kappa Epsilon became an international fraternity with the addition of the Alpha Phi chapter in 1898 at the University of Toronto, Canada.

Expansion to the United Kingdom had little success. Today,  chapters are located only in the United States and Canada.

Currently, Delta Kappa Epsilon has ten colonies, or associate chapters, that include Cornell University, Ithaca; Northeastern University, Boston; University of Colorado, Boulder, University of Mississippi, Oxford; University of Tennessee, Knoxville; University of Texas, Austin; University of Illinois Springfield; Vanderbilt University, Nashville; and Washington State University, Pullman.

 has grown to fifty-six chapters and has initiated over 85,000 members across North America.

Southern influence 
Despite traditionally selecting and installing  chapters along the Eastern Seaboard,  holds a strong reputation as a Southern fraternity; rightfully so, as two of the founding members were southerners. Between 1845 and 1846, thirteen of the thirty-eight active members of Phi chapter at Yale were southerners. Also that year, the Psi chapter at University of Alabama and then Chi chapter at Mississippi would firmly root Delta Kappa Epsilon as an institution steeped in southern heritage.

Purpose of chapters 
Chapters compete and are awarded equally on merits of leadership, chapter improvement and community service. The Lion Trophy is awarded each year to the chapter with most notable achievements in each category. In 2016, the Lion Trophy was awarded to the Rho chapter at Lafayette College. In 2011, Lion Trophy winner was Psi chapter at the University of Alabama. The chapter won this award in the wake of sponsoring a food drive to help relieve the Tuscaloosa communities devastated by tornadoes that year. The 2012 winner of the Lion Trophy was the University of British Columbia, and in 2013, the Lion Trophy went to both the Psi chapter and the Iota chapter at Centre College

The Delta Kappa Epsilon Club of New York 
 Members of Delta Kappa Epsilon who have completed their undergraduate education are eligible for membership in The Delta Kappa Epsilon Club of New York. The DKE Club was founded on May 9, 1885, occupying several different clubhouses throughout Midtown Manhattan including 30 West 44th Street which it purchased from the Yale Club of New York City in 1916. After renovations totaling $75,000, the clubhouse opened in January 1917. However just nine years later the Club relocated again when it sold the building to the Army and Navy Club of New York.

Partially due to the Great Depression, in 1932, the DKE Club entered into an affiliation with the Yale Club of New York whereby members would have the same access to its clubhouse and facilities as the 11,000 members of the Yale Club itself. Designed by James Gamble Rogers, the clubhouse is located at 50 Vanderbilt Avenue across from Grand Central Terminal. Upon opening its doors in 1915, the building became the largest clubhouse in the world and continues to be the largest college clubhouse in existence today.

The club has often hosted dinners and other events for notable alumni members of the fraternity such as polar explorer Robert Peary (who took a Deke flag to the North Pole with him in 1909).

Notable members 

Delta Kappa Epsilon members have included five of forty-five of the Presidents of the United States.

United States presidents 
Rutherford B. Hayes, Kenyon
Theodore Roosevelt, Harvard
Gerald Ford, Michigan
George H. W. Bush, Yale
George W. Bush, Yale

Franklin D. Roosevelt was a member of the Alpha chapter at Harvard and would be considered the sixth ΔΚΕ to serve as President of the United States; however, the Harvard chapter was de-recognized by  International due to the chapter's stance on dual membership with other fraternities. In the election of 1876, the Republican Party chose between two  members, nominating Hayes rather than rival and fellow , James G. Blaine. Blaine also ran unsuccessfully for President in 1884.

Vice presidents 
 Dan Quayle, DePauw
 Theodore Roosevelt, Harvard
 Gerald Ford, Michigan
 George H. W. Bush, Yale

Other notable alumni 
Many American and Canadian politicians, businessmen, sports figures, and artists have been members, including Joe Paterno, Herb Kelleher, J.P. Morgan, Jr., William Randolph Hearst, Cole Porter, Brett Kavanaugh, Ron DeSantis, Bradley Palmer, Henry Cabot Lodge, Dick Clark, Tom Landry, David Milch, and George Steinbrenner.  ΔΚΕ flags were carried to the North Pole by its discoverer, Admiral Robert Peary and to the Moon by astronaut Alan Bean. During the Civil War, the first Union officer killed in battle was  member Theodore Winthrop of Phi. The dying Edwin S. Rogers (Theta) of Maine was attended to by a Confederate Psi from Alabama, who observed the  pin and sent it to the family. During the Spanish–American War, the first American officer to be killed was a DKE member, Surgeon John B. Gibbs (Phi Chi).  member J. Frank Aldritch (Psi Phi) died when the USS Maine was sunk. ΔΚΕ has fifteen Medal of Honor recipients: George N. Bliss (Delta Chi-Cornell University); Deming Bronson (Kappa Epsilon-University of Washington); Allen Buchanan (Psi Phi-DePauw University); Richard E. Fleming (Phi Epsilon-University of Minnesota); George W. Ford (Zeta-Princeton University); Webb C. Hayes (Delta Chi-Cornell University); Ruel M. Johnson (Omicron-University of Michigan); Charles P. Mattocks (Theta-Bowdoin College); Samuel E. Pingree (Pi-Dartmouth College); Adolphus Staton (Beta-University of North Carolina); John W. Steele (Kappa-Miami University); Wager Swayne (Phi-Yale University ); Edward N. Whittier (Upsilon-Brown University); and Eri D. Woodbury (Sigma-Amherst College)and Theodore Roosevelt (Alpha-Harvard)

The late Dick Clark donated $1 million to the Delta Kappa Epsilon Foundation of Central New York, which handles finances for the fraternity's Syracuse chapter.

Controversy 

In 1846, one year after establishing the Zeta chapter at Princeton University and reportedly very unpopular with staff, the chapter was kicked off campus. The chapter was reinstated six years later, and again removed from campus and charter revoked. Only sixty-nine members were initiated during the chapter's brief existence.

On June 6, 1892, a pledge was led blindfolded through the street during his fraternity initiation towards Moriarty's Cafe, a popular student hang-out. He was told to run and did so at top speed. He ran into a sharp carriage pole, injuring himself. He was rendered unconscious, but the injury was not thought to be serious at the time. He suffered an intestinal rupture and died five days later of peritonitis.

In 1967, The New York Times reported on "frat-branding", the alleged use of a hot branding iron to make a "Δ" shaped scar on new fraternity members. The Yale chapter's then-president George W. Bush stated that they were "only cigarette burns."

In 1983, Yale University banned  activities allowing them to return a year later but off-campus.

In New Orleans in 1987 dozens of  fraternity members marched in blackface in a parade in broad daylight.

In 1989, Colgate University banned all  activities after the officials found members guilty of hazing, blackballing and other violations of university regulations. In 2005 Colgate University barred ΔΚΕ from campus for refusing to sell its house to the school and join a new student-residence initiative.  filed a lawsuit charging that the school violated its right to free association as well as antitrust laws by monopolizing the student housing market. In 2006 the Supreme Court of Madison County found that the fraternity had failed to state a cause of action and that its claim was "time-barred."

In 1989 Virginia Tech banned all  activities on campus and asked the national office to revoke its charter after reports of a racially tinged hazing incident during a pledge trip to Kenyon College in Ohio surfaced on campus. After the allegations emerged the Virginia Tech administration under President James D. McComas acted swiftly and terminated the registration of DKE and ended its affiliation with the university less than a week later. Allegedly a white  pledge had asked a black student at a Kenyon College party in Gambier, Ohio, if he could kiss her while another pledge photographed them. The pledge had been instructed to do something unusual during the trip and bring back photos to prove it. After friends of the woman learned of the incident, an argument ensued and the Virginia Tech pledges were escorted off the Kenyon College campus.  Its charter was not revoked and the DKE chapter continued to operate in its off campus house in Blacksburg despite the ban. Through the efforts of influential Virginia Tech DKE alumni and university donors, the chapter was ultimately re-instated in mid 90s.

In 1997, members of ΔΚΕ at Loyola University New Orleans and Tulane University invited students to celebrate Martin Luther King's Birthday “with fried chicken from Popeye's, watermelon and a ‘forty’.”

In December, 2008, the University of California, Berkeley suspended recognition of the local DKE chapter for alcohol, hazing and fire safety misconduct. The chapter never closed, and continued without affiliation or oversight by UC Berkeley. The national office and the alumni association maintained their association with the local chapter. Four years later, the chapter opted not to reapply for recognition by the university and continued as an independent fraternity. In May 2012, during a routine patrol of the campus, the chapter was visited by the County Vice Enforcement Team. Several citations were issued for under-age drinking.

In October 2010, Phi chapter at Yale came under fire after its members shouted inflammatory and misogynistic chants at an Old Campus pledge ritual, including "No means yes. Yes means anal". By October 24, 2010, Dean Mary Miller of Yale College had strongly recommended to the  National Executive Director, Dr. Douglas Lanpher, that the chapter at Yale be put on probation indefinitely. Instead, on May 17, 2011, the chapter was suspended for five years. The order barred  from conducting any activities on the Yale campus during that time.

In January 2011, the  chapter at the University of Alberta had its student group status suspended for five years after hazing video surfaced of pledges being confined in a plywood box, forced to eat vomit, and deprived of sleep, by other fraternity members.

In November 2014, a  colony in Edinburgh, since closed, had the minutes leaked from a meeting in March 2014 by the University of Edinburgh student newspaper, The Student. The minutes allegedly made reference to comments that joked about rape, sexual harassment, transphobia and hazing. The story gained traction in both national and international media, being picked up by The Independent, The Huffington Post, and Time magazine.

In 2018 after Christine Blasey Ford accused Brett Kavanaugh of sexual assault, an old photograph surfaced showing two members of  marching across the Yale campus, one carrying a flag made from women's underwear. Kavanaugh, who is not in the photograph, was a member of the fraternity when the photograph was taken. One of the members told the student paper that the underwear was obtained consensually, but female classmates said their rooms were ransacked by  members while they were in class, saying they were "loud, entitled, pushy and creepy".

In the spring of 2018, the  chapter at Virginia Tech had its student group status suspended for ten years after being found responsible for alcohol violations, hazing, interference with the student conduct process, and failure to observe rules and regulations while on deferred suspension. The Sigma Alpha chapter of DKE, the oldest fraternity at Virginia Tech, continues to operate but is not recognized by the university. The chapter is eligible to be re-instated in 2028.

Following the fraternity's turbulent return to Yale University campus life in 2016, few female sports teams, and fewer sororities, agreed to mix with the Phi chapter of ΔΚΕ.

See also 
 List of Delta Kappa Epsilon brothers
 List of Delta Kappa Epsilon chapters
 List of social fraternities and sororities

References

External links 
 DKE Organization Home Page including DKE history
 The DKE Club of New York
 GoDeke.org Dekes in the News
 Delta Tau Chi

 
International student societies
Fraternity Leadership Association
North American Interfraternity Conference
Student organizations established in 1844
1844 establishments in Connecticut